Hoi Ping Chamber of Commerce Secondary School (Chinese: 旅港開平商會中學, abbr. HPCCSS) is a Band 1 EMI secondary school located in Ho Man Tin, Kowloon Hong Kong. Hoi Ping is also well known for its school athletic team which ranked third in the Hong Kong Inter-School Athletics Competition.

Vision
Hoi Ping Chamber of Commerce Secondary School's school motto is Morality (德, "Tak"), Wisdom (智, "Chi"), Health (健, "Kin") and Diligence (勤, "Kan"). The missions of the school are said to be as follows:
To nourish students through morality education.
To promulgate knowledge which is essential in society.
To formulate the ability of independent thinking among students.
To engender the ability of self-studying among students.
To advocate diligence.
To facilitate the development of mental and physical health alike.

History

Founding 
Hoi Ping Chamber of Commerce Secondary School was founded in 1973 as a co-educational aided school. The Alumni Association was established in 1981. The Students' Union and the Parent-Teacher Association were set up in 1987 and 1999 respectively. Hoi Ping has long been a top BAND 1 school in Kowloon district.

In 1998, its use of English as the Medium of Instruction was approved by the Education Department of the HKSAR.

In recent years 
To facilitate progress, the school set up the School Development Team in 2002. Based on the school's "Strengths, Weaknesses, Opportunities and Threats" analysis and their teachers' opinions, the team has formulated the School Development Plan 2003–2006. The major concerns are:
enhancing student personal growth
enhancing teaching and learning
improving teaching and learning environment.

True to its plan, HPCCSS has sustained rapid growth and improvement in recent years, including: encouraging and employing the use of IT technology, the construction of a New Wing (pictured), which includes classrooms and a new library, and the promotion of a wide variety of new activities, including dancing and drama. It was noted for its excellent athletic achievements, such as in the Boys Inter-school Athletics Championships where it was awarded the fourth position in 2004–2005.

Annals

Features and facilities

Basic facilities 
The New Wing was completed and handed over to the school in August 2005, with a new library set up, using new equipment. There are thirty classrooms, two supportive education rooms, four laboratories, two computer rooms, a geography room, a music room, a needlework room, a home economics room, an art room, a multi-media learning center, a language room, a library, a student activity center, a STEM room, and a multi-purpose room. All the rooms are air-conditioned and furnished with computer nodes for accessing the Internet.

The environment 
Plants have been allocated throughout the school in an effort "to beautify the learning environment." Activities are organized for students to take care of these plants and take part in 'green'-ifying the school. Announcements are often made to remind students about protecting the school environment.

Extra-curricular activities
There are altogether forty clubs available, despite the lack of activities during the COVID pandemic. Students are encouraged to join extracurricular activities and, in the meantime, working hard in academic results. The Students' Union also organizes activities for students, ranging from selling affordable stationeries to chess competitions.

House System 
The school is committed to providing her students with an all-round whole-person education. In line with the school motto Morality (德, "Tak"), Wisdom (智, "Chi"), Health (健, "Kin") and Diligence (勤, "Kan"), the school emphasizes a balanced development in students' conduct, academic pursuit and extracurricular activities. The school motto is emphasized using a House system, with red, green, yellow and blue representing the four virtues, respectively.

Subjects

Form 1 to Form 3 
 English as Medium of Instruction:
English Language
Mathematics
History
Geography
Life and Society
Economics (Form 3)
Integrated Science (Form 1 to Form 2)
Chemistry (Form 3)
Physics (Form 3)
Biology (Form 3)
Computer Literacy
Visual Arts
Music
Physical Education
Home Economics (Form 1 to Form 2)
 Chinese as Medium of Instruction:
Chinese Language
Chinese History
Putonghua

From 4 to From 6 (HKDSE Programme) 
Core subjects (Compulsory):
 English as Medium of Instruction:
English Language
Mathematics
Liberal Studies
Physical Education 
 Chinese as Medium of Instruction:
Chinese Language
Electives (3 Subjects must be selected):
 English as Medium of Instruction:
Mathematics M1/M2
History
Geography
Economics
BAFS
Physics
Chemistry
Biology
Information and Communication Technology
Visual Arts
 Chinese as Medium of Instruction:
Chinese History
Chinese Literature

Academic performance 
The results in the DSE are above average and the university admission rate exceed 50%.

In 2017, the successful JUPAS admission is 75.2% with the best individual result of four 5** and three 5*.

Notable alumnae

Pierre Lau - Managing Director, Citibank, renowned equity research analyst. Being No.1 Asian utility analyst from poll run by Institutional Investor (II) Magazine for 13 consecutive years (2007-2019).

References

External links
Official website

Secondary schools in Hong Kong
Secondary schools in Ho Man Tin
Educational institutions established in 1973